Nils Bergström may refer to:
Nils Bergström (athlete) (1898–1988), Swedish long-distance runner
Nils Bergström (ice hockey) (born 1985), Swedish ice hockey player
Nils Bergström (bandy), Swedish bandy and footballer player